The Civic Will – Republican Party (Irgenii Zorig Bügd Nairamdakh Nam) was a short-lived political party in Mongolia. It was the result of a merger between S. Oyuun's Civic Will Party and B. Jargalsaikhan's Republican Party on February 22, 2002.  It split up again before the 2004 parliamentary elections.

References

2002 establishments in Mongolia
Defunct liberal political parties
Defunct political parties in Mongolia
Political parties established in 2002
Political parties with year of disestablishment missing